Panaxatriol is an organic compound characterizing a group of ginsenosides. It is a dammarane-type tetracyclic triterpene sapogenin found in ginseng (Panax ginseng) and in notoginseng (Panax pseudoginseng).  It is formed by the dehydration of protopanaxatriol.

See also
 Protopanaxadiol

References

External links
 Panaxatriol on www.chemblink.com

Triterpenes
Tetrahydropyrans
Triols
Sterols